"Face to Face" is a song by Australian singer-songwriter Ruel. The song was released on 8 August 2019, and was produced by M-Phazes. It is the second single from his sophomore EP, Free Time.

Music video 
The music video was released on 8 August 2019—the same day as the song's release—and was directed by Grey Ghost. The video shows Ruel following a fictional French singer, ECÂF, breaking into her venue and eventually being kicked out. At the end of the music video, during her performance, ECÂF's song "Pictures" was featured.

Reception 
Michael Love Michael from Paper noted that the song has "a retro soul feel," and that it "tells a very modern tale of crushing on someone through a screen...capturing the anxieties in teen and millennial hearts alike".

Bella DiGrazia from The Daily Item stated that Ruel's "high and low range is hauntingly enticing" and that the saxophone solo towards the end of the song won her over.

Perez Hilton praises him and his song, saying that Ruel "continues to impress us with not just the quality of his work but also the variety".

Credits and personnel 
Credits adapted from Tidal.
 Ruel Vincent van Djik – lead artist, songwriting
 Mark Landon – producer, songwriting
 Joseph Angel – songwriting
 Ian Peres – bass
 Sylvain Richard – drums
 Dan Walsh – guitar
 Cy Leo – harmonica
 Amy Ahn – harp
 Damian Smith – keyboards
 Matt Colton – mastering engineer
 Tele Fresco – miscellaneous producer
 Eric J. Dubowsky – mixing engineer
 DoXa – programmer 
 Ted Case – strings

Charts

Certifications

References 

2019 singles
2019 songs
Ruel (singer) songs
Songs written by M-Phazes
Songs written by Ruel (singer)